Options Secondary School (Commonly known as The Portal), is located in Chula Vista, California on the Chula Vista Adult School campus. It is run under the "Alternative Education" division of the Sweetwater Union High School District, which also runs the Independent Studies program. It has a small campus and a low ratio of students to teachers, in some cases, no more than twenty students in a class. The school operates on a bell schedule from 12:10 PM to 6:06 PM, with three periods a day. Period one is from 12:10 to 1:52, followed by a thirty minute lunch period. After this, second period begins at 2:27, and runs until 4:09. After a ten-minute passing period, period three finishes the school day, from 4:19 all the way to 6:06.

The school opened with the original mission to cater to those with "individual learning styles", in keeping with its original name, "Sweetwater Academy for Individual Learning Styles." It was designed for those that didn't fit in at other schools, based upon learning plans. In May 2012, it was decided that the name of the school would be changed to "The Portal: A learning community", much to the chagrin of the students. Most students who have attended since before the 2012–2013 school year still refer to the school as "Sails". The district has tried several times to shut the school, to no avail. After Prop 32 passed in November 2012, the district received funds from taxes to upgrade and renovate campuses, as well as educational technologies. Some form of loophole prevented the school from acquiring grants that other campuses received.

Students
Students attending the school are as diverse, if not more, than most other high schools. The Portal receives students from all over the district, from Imperial Beach to National City, to Eastlake and Otay Ranch. Students are from various backgrounds. Most students attending the Portal have for one or more reasons not been successful at a large comprehensive schools. Having smaller class size, quarter system that focuses on three classes at a time, afternoon schedule, and a school climate that fosters equality enables most students to become successful.

References

High schools in San Diego County, California
Public high schools in California
Education in Chula Vista, California